Cadlina scabriuscula is a species of sea slug or dorid nudibranch, a marine gastropod mollusc in the family Cadlinidae.

Distribution

Description
The maximum recorded body length is 12 mm.

Ecology
Minimum recorded depth is 68 m. Maximum recorded depth is 68 m.

References

Cadlinidae
Gastropods described in 1890